Sheryl Crow and Friends: Live from Central Park is a live album by American singer-songwriter Sheryl Crow, released on December 7, 1999, by A&M Records. Although it was not commercially successful upon its release, merely reaching  107 on the Billboard 200, the album has managed to reach US sales of 486,000 units as of January 2008, earning it gold certification consideration. The concert was held in New York's Central Park on September 14, 1999, and featured some of Crow's many musical friends; the Dixie Chicks (now simply the Chicks), Fleetwood Mac's Stevie Nicks, Pretenders leader Chrissie Hynde, the Rolling Stones' Keith Richards, Sarah McLachlan and legendary guitar virtuoso Eric Clapton. The concert's emcee was actor and comedian Bill Murray, another friend of Crow's.

Track listing

"Gold Dust Woman" was originally performed by Fleetwood Mac.
"Happy" was originally performed by The Rolling Stones.
"White Room" was originally performed by Cream.
"Tombstone Blues" was originally performed by Bob Dylan.

Personnel
Sheryl Crow – acoustic guitar, bass guitar, harmonica, electric guitar, vocals, record producer
Jim Bogios – drums
Matthew Brubeck – bass guitar, cello
Mike Rowe – keyboards
Mary Rowell – acoustic guitar, violin
Tim Smith – bass guitar, electric guitar, background vocals
Peter Stroud – acoustic guitar, electric guitar, slide guitar
Eric Clapton – "White Room"
Dixie Chicks – "Strong Enough"
Chrissie Hynde – "If It Makes You Happy"
Sarah McLachlan – "The Difficult Kind"
Stevie Nicks – "Gold Dust Woman"
Keith Richards – "Happy"

Charts
Album – Billboard (North America)

Awards
Grammy Awards

References

Sheryl Crow live albums
1999 live albums
A&M Records albums
Albums recorded at Central Park
Collaborative albums